The Loughinisland Churches are the remains of three ruined churches in Loughinisland, County Down, Northern Ireland, dating from the 13th to the 17th centuries. They are situated in Tievenadarragh townland, in a large graveyard on an island in Loughinisland Lake, now reached by a causeway. The churches are state-care historic monuments at grid ref: J4234 4537.

History

The island and its churches appear in medieval sources under the name Lerkes or Lyrge.

Features

The North Church is 66.5 ft by 30 ft, the gables and most of the side walls are standing and a doorway in the west end has a narrow window above it.

References

External links

Geograph - Photograph of the North Church
Geograph - Photograph of South Church

Archaeological sites in County Down
Buildings and structures in County Down
Religion in County Down